Halichoeres podostigma, the axil spot wrasse, is a species of salt water wrasse found in the Western Central Pacific Ocean.

Size

References

podostigma
Taxa named by Pieter Bleeker
Fish described in 1854